This article includes the table with land use statistics by country. Countries are ranked by their total cultivated land area, which is the sum of the total arable land area and total area of permanent crops. 

Arable land is defined as being cultivated for crops like wheat, maize, and rice, all of which are replanted after each harvest.  Permanent cropland is defined as being cultivated for crops like citrus, coffee, and rubber, which are not replanted after each harvest; this also includes land under flowering shrubs, fruit trees, nut trees, and vines, but excludes land under trees grown for wood or timber. Other lands include any lands not arable nor under permanent crops; this includes permanent meadows and pastures, forests and woodlands, built-on areas, roads, barren land, and so on.

Percentage figures for arable land, permanent crops land and other lands are all taken from the CIA World Factbook as well as total land area figures (Note: the total area of a country is defined as the sum of total land area and total water area together.)  All other figures, including total cultivated land area, are calculated on the basis of this mentioned dataset.

See also 
 Exclusive economic zone
 Food and Agriculture Organization

References

External links 
 FAO – Country Profiles

Agricultural land
Lists by country